Snaefell –  is the highest mountain and the only summit higher than  on the Isle of Man, at  above sea level. The summit is crowned by a railway station, cafe and several communications masts.

Views

It is a well-known saying in the Isle of Man that on a clear day six kingdoms can be seen from the top: the Isle of Man, England, Ireland, Scotland, Wales and Heaven. Some versions add a seventh kingdom, that of Manannán (or the sea).

The plaque at the summit indicates the directions of five points from Snaefell as well as their distances:
  to the Mull of Galloway (Scotland)
  to Scafell (England)
  to the Mountains of Mourne (Northern Ireland)
  to Liverpool (England)
  to Dublin (Republic of Ireland)

(For some reason, Wales is absent from the plaque).

While highly dependent on weather conditions and visibility, all of the four countries of the United Kingdom can be seen from the summit of Snaefell. This includes much of the southern coast of Dumfries and Galloway in Scotland, the Lake District in England, the northern coast of Anglesey in Wales, and the Mountains of Mourne in Northern Ireland. Points in the Republic of Ireland in County Louth can also be seen.

Climbing Snaefell

The A18 Snaefell Mountain Road passes over the slopes of Snaefell, and is the highest section of the Snaefell Mountain Course over which the Isle of Man TT Races are held. Walkers often use the car park on this road near the Bungalow railway station (last railway stop before the summit) from which there is a rough path to the peak. The trail has sections of gravel, slate stones, grass and rock. While the angle of ascent steepens significantly closer to the summit, special climbing equipment is not required. However, caution is required in steep areas as the grass, earth and rocks are often slippery. Average climb time on foot on a dry footpath is about 45 minutes.

A geodetic marker embedded in the small, concrete obelisk indicates the true mountain summit. The rock cairn standing nearby has an information plaque on top.

Weather
During hurricane storm-force winds, the  Civil Aviation Authority radio mast at the Snaefell summit was damaged and blown down on 2 December 1966.

Gallery

References

External links
 Computer generated summit panoramas North South Index
 Snaefell Mountain Railway
 Cold War RADAR Site
 Snaefell Fell Race

Marilyns of the Isle of Man
Mountains and hills of the Isle of Man